The 2002 NAIA Division I women's basketball tournament was the tournament held by the NAIA to determine the national champion of women's college basketball among its Division I members in the United States and Canada for the 2001–02 basketball season.

Three-time defending champions Oklahoma City defeated Southern Nazarene in the championship game, 82–73, to claim the Stars' fifth NAIA national title.

The tournament was played at the Oman Arena in Jackson, Tennessee.

Qualification

The tournament field remained fixed at thirty-two teams, with the top sixteen teams receiving seeds.

The tournament continued to utilize a simple single-elimination format.

Bracket

See also
2002 NAIA Division I men's basketball tournament
2002 NCAA Division I women's basketball tournament
2002 NCAA Division II women's basketball tournament
2002 NCAA Division III women's basketball tournament
2002 NAIA Division II women's basketball tournament

References

NAIA
NAIA Women's Basketball Championships
2002 in sports in Tennessee